The Sunshine Millions Distaff is a race for thoroughbred horses held in January at Santa Anita Park in Arcadia, California or at Gulfstream Park in Hallandale Beach, Florida. Half the eight races of the Sunshine Millions are run at one track and half at the other.

Open to fillies and mares four-years-old and older willing to race one and one/eighth miles on the dirt, the Sunshine Millions Distaff is an ungraded stakes event but currently carries a purse of $200,000.  This race is also known as the Ocala Breeders' Sales Distaff (in 2006) as part of the eight-race Sunshine Millions series.

In its 16th running in 2017, the series of races called the Sunshine Millions are restricted to horses bred either in Florida or in California and is the brainchild of the Thoroughbred Owners of California, the California Thoroughbred Breeders Association, the Florida Thoroughbred Breeders' and Owners' Association, Inc., Santa Anita Park, Gulfstream Park, and Magna Entertainment Corporation.

Winners of the Sunshine Millions Distaff

References
 Official site of the Sunshine Millions

Restricted stakes races in the United States
Horse races in the United States
Triple Crown Prep Races
Mile category horse races for fillies and mares
Recurring events established in 2003